The White House counsel is a senior staff appointee of the president of the United States whose role is to advise the president on all legal issues concerning the president and their administration.  The White House counsel also oversees the Office of White House Counsel, a team of lawyers and support staff who provide legal guidance for the president and the White House Office.  At least when White House counsel is advising the president on legal matters pertaining to the duties or prerogatives of the president, this office is also called Counsel to the President. 

Stuart Delery has been the White House counsel since July 2022, replacing Dana Remus, who served since January 2021.

Responsibilities
The Office of Counsel to the President and Vice President was created in 1943, and is responsible for advising on all legal aspects of policy questions; legal issues arising in connection with the president's decision to sign or veto legislation, ethical questions, financial disclosures; and conflicts of interest during employment and post employment. The counsel's office also helps define the line between official and political activities, oversees  executive appointments and judicial selection, handles presidential pardons, reviews legislation and presidential statements, and handles lawsuits against the president in his role as president, as well as serving as the White House contact for the Department of Justice.

Limitations
Although the White House counsel offers legal advice to the president and vice president, the counsel does so in the president's and vice president's official capacity, and does not serve as the president's personal attorney.  Therefore, controversy has emerged over the scope of the attorney–client privilege between the counsel and the president and vice president, namely with John Dean of Watergate notoriety.  It is clear, however, that the privilege does not apply in strictly personal matters. It also does not apply to legislative proceedings by the U.S. Congress against the president due to allegations of misconduct while in office, such as formal censures or impeachment proceedings. In those situations the president relies on a personal attorney if he desires confidential legal advice. The office is also distinct from the judiciary, and from others who are not appointed to positions but nominated by the president and confirmed by the Senate. These would be foremost the attorney general of the United States, and the principal deputy and other assistants, who are nominated by the president to oversee the United States Department of Justice, or the solicitor general of the United States and staff (the solicitor general is the fourth-ranking official in the Justice Department), who argue cases before the U.S. Supreme Court (and in lower federal courts) for the Justice Department when it is a party to the case.

List of White House counsels

References

External links
 Executive Office of the President
 Records of Thomas E. Stephens, White House Counsel, 1953, Dwight D. Eisenhower Presidential Library
 Diaries of Bernard M. Shanley, White House Counsel, 1953-1955, Dwight D. Eisenhower Presidential Library
 Records of Gerald Morgan, White House Counsel, 1955-1958, Dwight D. Eisenhower Presidential Library 
 Records of David W. Kendall, White House Counsel, 1958-1961, Dwight D. Eisenhower Presidential Library

United States presidential advisors
 
Executive Office of the President of the United States
Presidency of the United States
Counsel
1943 establishments in Washington, D.C.